The M462 Abir (English: "Knight") is a 4x4 military vehicle in service with the Israel Defense Forces, developed by  Automotive Industries Ltd. to serve as a replacement for the M325.

Specifications
The M462 can carry 13 troops or a cargo of 1800 kg. The M462 can be fitted with one forward machine gun and a side machine gun.

Variants

M462 Abir: standard model.
M462 ATGM Portee: with BGM-71 TOW.
M462 M40A2 Portee: with M40A2 106mm recoilless rifle.
M462 Rhino: a 4x4 armoured vehicle based on the M462, used for high risk area patrol, riot control, special operations, and command post.
M462 Fire: bush fire engine.
M462 Ambulance: military ambulance, 4 litter cases or 8 sitting patients.
 Anti-tank: armed with two Nimrod anti-tank missile pods

Operators

Current operators

Actual

Former

External links

Military vehicles of Israel
Military vehicles introduced in the 1960s